Matapouri is a coastal settlement in the Whangarei District of Northland, New Zealand. It is 7 km north of Tutukaka and 35 km north-east of Whangarei, in an area known as the Tutukaka Coast. Matapouri was described by Whangarei District Council in 2010 as "an archetypal Kiwi bach settlement". Holiday homes make up 90 per cent of the houses and at holiday times the number of residents swells to seven times its permanent population.

History
The early European settlement of Matapouri was based on the milling and transport of timber. The first school was built in 1899 and the first recorded store in 1912.

Te Wai o Te Taniwha, the Mermaid Pools, was an informal tourist attraction, but was closed indefinitely in 2019 by the local Māori authorities, Te Whanau ā Rangiwhakaahu Hapū Trust, due to visitors leaving toilet waste and rubbish.

Demographics
Statistics New Zealand describes Matapouri as a rural settlement. The settlement is part of the larger Matapouri-Tutukaka statistical area.

Matapouri had a population of 192 at the 2018 New Zealand census, an increase of 45 people (30.6%) since the 2013 census, and an increase of 48 people (33.3%) since the 2006 census. There were 69 households, comprising 90 males and 99 females, giving a sex ratio of 0.91 males per female. The median age was 46.1 years (compared with 37.4 years nationally), with 42 people (21.9%) aged under 15 years, 21 (10.9%) aged 15 to 29, 96 (50.0%) aged 30 to 64, and 33 (17.2%) aged 65 or older.

Ethnicities were 65.6% European/Pākehā, 37.5% Māori, 10.9% Pacific peoples, 4.7% Asian, and 1.6% other ethnicities. People may identify with more than one ethnicity.

Although some people chose not to answer the census's question about religious affiliation, 42.2% had no religion, 45.3% were Christian and 4.7% had other religions.

Of those at least 15 years old, 36 (24.0%) people had a bachelor's or higher degree, and 18 (12.0%) people had no formal qualifications. The median income was $27,400, compared with $31,800 nationally. 24 people (16.0%) earned over $70,000 compared to 17.2% nationally. The employment status of those at least 15 was that 63 (42.0%) people were employed full-time, 21 (14.0%) were part-time, and 12 (8.0%) were unemployed.

Matapouri-Tutukaka statistical area

Matapouri-Tutukaka had a population of 1,692 at the 2018 New Zealand census, an increase of 345 people (25.6%) since the 2013 census, and an increase of 489 people (40.6%) since the 2006 census. There were 657 households, comprising 846 males and 846 females, giving a sex ratio of 1.0 males per female. The median age was 49.1 years (compared with 37.4 years nationally), with 297 people (17.6%) aged under 15 years, 198 (11.7%) aged 15 to 29, 834 (49.3%) aged 30 to 64, and 363 (21.5%) aged 65 or older.

Ethnicities were 89.4% European/Pākehā, 17.7% Māori, 2.5% Pacific peoples, 1.8% Asian, and 2.1% other ethnicities. People may identify with more than one ethnicity.

The percentage of people born overseas was 22.0, compared with 27.1% nationally.

Although some people chose not to answer the census's question about religious affiliation, 64.0% had no religion, 26.6% were Christian, 0.4% were Hindu, 0.2% were Muslim, 0.2% were Buddhist and 2.7% had other religions.

Of those at least 15 years old, 384 (27.5%) people had a bachelor's or higher degree, and 159 (11.4%) people had no formal qualifications. The median income was $32,300, compared with $31,800 nationally. 258 people (18.5%) earned over $70,000 compared to 17.2% nationally. The employment status of those at least 15 was that 630 (45.2%) people were employed full-time, 249 (17.8%) were part-time, and 36 (2.6%) were unemployed.

Amenities
Matapōuri Marae is a meeting ground for Ngāti Rehua, Ngāti Toki-ki-te-Moananui of Ngātiwai, and Te Whānau a Rangiwhaakahu of Te Āki Tai. It includes Te Tokomanawa o te Aroha meeting house.

The present Matapouri Hall, based on a Keith Hay Homes design, was constructed on site in the 1970s. The hall has hosted organisations such as the Women's Institute as well as providing a place for church services, polling booths, social gatherings, New Years gala and other community events throughout the years. An earlier hall built in 1912 was demolished in 1970.

References
Citations

Works cited
 

Whangarei District
Populated places in the Northland Region